Luigi Lo Cascio (born 20 October 1967) is an Italian actor. He won the David di Donatello as best actor for his starring role in I cento passi. In 2012, he debuted as film director and writer with La città ideale.

Filmography

Films

Television

Theatre
1989: Aspettando Godot
1989: I coralli
1990: La sposa
1992: La Signora delle Camelie1992: La morte di Empedocle1994: Il labirinto di Orfeo1994: Coriolano1995: Verso Tebe1996: Romeo e Giulietta1997: La famiglia Scroffenstein1997: Gloria del Teatro Immaginario1997: La figlia dell'Aria1998: Salomè1999: Il figlio di Pulcinella1999: Amleto1999: Sogno di una notte di mezza estate2006: Nella tana2008: La caccia''

External links
 
  Unofficial site

1967 births
Living people
Italian male film actors
Male actors from Palermo
Accademia Nazionale di Arte Drammatica Silvio D'Amico alumni
David di Donatello winners
Nastro d'Argento winners
Ciak d'oro winners
Volpi Cup for Best Actor winners